Bell Bottom Country is the second major label studio album by American country music singer-songwriter Lainey Wilson. Her fourth album overall, it follows 2021's Sayin' What I'm Thinkin' and was released via BBR Music Group on October 28, 2022. It was preceded by the single "Heart Like a Truck". Sonically, the album combines country with elements of '70s rock, funk and soul.

Background
Wilson co-wrote all of the album's sixteen tracks, with the exception of a cover of "What's Up?", originally recorded by 4 Non Blondes, which Wilson had been performing during her live shows. Sonically, the album has been described as "country at its core", with elements of '70s rock, funk and soul.

The album was announced on August 16, 2022, alongside the promotional single "Watermelon Moonshine". In an interview with Taste Of Country, Wilson explained of the album's title "Sure, I love a good pair of bell bottoms, but Bell Bottom Country to me has always been about the flare and what makes someone unique—I have really embraced mine, and I hope y'all can hear that across this project". Of the short time frame between her debut and sophomore major label albums, Wilson stated ""I've lived quite a bit of life in the past few years, and I have a lot more to say." The song "These Boots (Deddy's Song)" is a tribute to Wilson's father, who suffered a medical emergency that caused her to cancel a number of live shows.

"Live Off", the album's second promotional single, was released on September 23, 2022, following an acoustic performance of the track that was posted to her Instagram a week earlier. Describing the song, Wilson expressed "this one's one of my favorites off of my new album. 'Live Off' is all about the things that make my world go 'round... my backroad hometown, my dog, my family, my friends, and music, of course."

Upon making her acting debut on Yellowstone in November 2022, Wilson released two new songs—"Smell Like Smoke" and "New Friends"—that were tacked onto the streaming and digital versions of Bell Bottom Country.

Track listing

Personnel
Ashland Craft – background vocals
Fred Eltringham – drums, percussion, timpani, claps
Aslan Freeman – acoustic guitar, electric guitar, claps
Derek George – background vocals
Josh Groppel – background vocals, claps
Jason Hall – background vocals, gang vocals, claps
Joanna Janét – background vocals
Jay Joyce – B-3 organ, bass guitar, acoustic guitar, dobro, drums, electric guitar, ganjo, keyboards, percussion, programming, background vocals, gang vocals, claps
Billy Justineau – B-3 organ, keyboards, Moog, piano, pump organ
Joel King – bass guitar, claps
Jimmy Mansfield – claps
Rob McNelley – acoustic guitar, dobro, electric guitar, sitar, claps
Brad Pemberton – drums
Molly Tuttle – acoustic guitar, background vocals
Kasey Tyndall – background vocals
Lainey Wilson – lead vocals, background vocals, claps
Charlie Worsham – acoustic guitar, banjo, electric guitar, mandolin

Charts

References

2022 albums
Albums produced by Jay Joyce
BBR Music Group albums
Lainey Wilson albums